State Highway 144 (abbreviated SH-144) is a state highway in the Little Dixie region of Oklahoma. It runs  in Pushmataha and Le Flore Counties. It does not have any lettered spur routes.

Route description
SH-144 begins at US-271, nine miles (14 km) southeast of Clayton. From there it runs to the east through the community of Nashoba, and into the Kiamichi Mountains. Highway 144 parallels the Little River most of the way through the mountains, passing through Fewell, and just south of Honobia.

Highway 144 ends at US-259 in the Kiamichi Mountains, just east of Octavia.

Junction list

References

External links
 SH-144 at OKHighways.com

144
Transportation in Pushmataha County, Oklahoma
Transportation in Le Flore County, Oklahoma